Navin Chan (born 29 December 1978) is a Trinidadian cricketer. He played in twelve first-class and two List A matches for Trinidad and Tobago from 1999 to 2003.

See also
 List of Trinidadian representative cricketers

References

External links
 

1978 births
Living people
Trinidad and Tobago cricketers